Dalbergia latifolia (synonym Dalbergia emarginata) is a premier timber species, also known as the Indian rosewood (Tamil / தமிழ்: Eetti / ஈட்டி). It is native to low-elevation tropical monsoon forests of south east India. Some common names in English include rosewood, Bombay blackwood,  roseta rosewood, East Indian rosewood, reddish-brown rosewood, Indian palisandre, and Java palisandre. Its Indian common names are beete, and satisal.

Description and biology

The tree has grey bark that peels in long fibres, pinnately compound leaves, and bunches of small white flowers. It grows as both an evergreen and a deciduous tree in the deciduous monsoon forests of India making the tree very drought hardy.

Haematonectria haematococca is a fungal pest of the tree, causing damage to the leaves and the heartwood in Javanese plantations. In India, trees may be subject to serious damage from a species of Phytophthora, a water mold genus.

Germplasm resources for D. latifolia are maintained by the Kerala Forest Research Institute in Thrissur, Kerala, India.

Uses

The tree produces a hard, durable, heavy wood that, when properly cured, is durable and resistant to rot and insects. It is grown as a plantation wood in both India and Java, often in dense, single species groves, to produce its highly desirable long straight bore. Wood from the tree is used in premium furniture making and cabinetry, guitar bodies and fretboards, exotic veneers, carvings, boats, skis, and for reforestation.

Under the Indian Forest Act, 1927 the exportation of lumber products from wild harvested D. latifolia is illegal. There exists an international high demand and price for the wood due to its excellent qualities of having a long straight bore, its strength, and its high density. However, the tree is slow-growing; Javanese plantations were started in the late nineteenth century, but, due to its slow growth, plantations have not expanded beyond Java and India. Many once popular uses for D. latifolia wood have now been replaced with Dalbergia sissoo wood and engineered rosewoods, for economic purposes in cottage industries.

See also
 Rosewood

References

latifolia
Flora of the Indian subcontinent
Flora of Java
Flora of Myanmar